Don José may refer to:

A character in the opera Carmen
Don José Vidal (1763–1823), Spanish grandee and official in the Mississippi Territory
José Antonio Yorba (1743–1825), Spanish soldier and early settler of Spanish California
José Bernardo de Tagle y Bracho, 1st Marquis of Torre Tagle (1644–1740), Peruvian aristocrat who had high status in Spain and Peru
José Darío Argüello (1753–1828), Spanish soldier and California pioneer, and twice governor of California
José de San Martín (1778–1850), Argentine general and the prime leader South American independence from Spain
Pepin Garcia CEO of Don Pepín Cigars
José Luis Paris ,the "Don Jose" of British TV and Hallmark recordings

See also
José